Filip Mihaljević (born 9 March 1992) is a Croatian footballer who last played as a striker for League of Ireland Premier Division club Finn Harps. He played for Cambodian club Visakha in 2020.

References

External links
 

1992 births
Living people
Footballers from Zagreb
Association football forwards
Croatian footballers
Croatia youth international footballers
GNK Dinamo Zagreb II players
NK Sesvete players
NK Široki Brijeg players
NK Slaven Belupo players
NK Lokomotiva Zagreb players
PFC Lokomotiv Plovdiv players
Widzew Łódź players
Visakha FC players
U.S. 1913 Seregno Calcio players
NK Kustošija players
Finn Harps F.C. players
First Football League (Croatia) players
Premier League of Bosnia and Herzegovina players
Croatian Football League players
First Professional Football League (Bulgaria) players
II liga players
Cambodian Premier League players
League of Ireland players
Croatian expatriate footballers
Expatriate footballers in Bosnia and Herzegovina
Croatian expatriate sportspeople in Bosnia and Herzegovina
Expatriate footballers in Bulgaria
Croatian expatriate sportspeople in Bulgaria
Expatriate footballers in Poland
Croatian expatriate sportspeople in Poland
Expatriate footballers in Cambodia
Expatriate association footballers in the Republic of Ireland